Pierre-Ludovic Duclos and Riccardo Ghedin were the defending champions but decided not to participate.
Divij Sharan and Vishnu Vardhan defeated Lee Hsin-han and Peng Hsien-yin 6–3, 6–4 in the final to win the tournament.

Seeds

Draw

Draw

References
 Main Draw

Doubles
Chang-Sat Bangkok Open - Doubles
 in Thai tennis